ESSA-1 (or OT-3) was a spin-stabilized operational meteorological satellite. Its name was derived from that of its oversight agency, the Environmental Science Services Administration (ESSA).

Launch 
ESSA-1 was launched on February 3, 1966, at 07:41 UTC. It was launched atop a Delta rocket from Cape Canaveral, Florida. ESSA-1 had an inclination of 97.91°, and an orbited the earth once every 100 minutes.

ESSA-1 had a similar design to that of the TIROS satellite series. It had a reinforced baseplate, which carried most of the subsystems and a cover assembly (hat). ESSA-1 had approximately 10,000 1-cm by 2-cm solar cells, which charged 21 nickel–cadmium batteries. ESSA-1 was designed to take pictures of daytime cloud cover, record them, and transmit them when it was in range of a ground acquisition station.

The satellite spin rate and attitude were determined primarily by a magnetic attitude spin coil (MASC). The MASC was a current-carrying coil mounted in the cover assembly. The magnetic field induced by the coil interacted with that of the Earth's magnetic field, and provided the necessary torque to maintain a desired spin rate of 9.225 revolutions per minute (rpm). Five small solid-fuel thrusters mounted on the baseplate provided a secondary means of controlling the spin rate.

ESSA-1 operated normally until October 6, 1966, when the camera system failed. The spacecraft was fully deactivated on May 8, 1967, after being left on for an additional period of time for engineering purposes.

References

External links

Spacecraft launched in 1966
Weather satellites of the United States